Algie's Romance is a 1918 Australian silent film. It is a comedy starring Charlie Chaplin impersonator Leonard Doogood as an Englishman who arrives in Australia and has adventures.

Plot
An Englishman, Algie, arrives in Australia and stays with friends in the country. Twin sisters both fall in love with him. Various practical jokes are played on Algie, but he eventually proves his mettle. He proves himself a crack shot and gains a wife.

Cast
Leonard Doogood as Algie
Boyd Irwin
May Henry
June Henry

Production
Doogood was a Charlie Chaplin impersonator who had previously made a one-reel short film in South Australia, Charlie's Twin Brother.

The film was shot on a cattle station owned by the Downer family in South Australia, near the Mount Lofty Ranges. Technical facilities were provided by Southern Cross Feature Films.

The film was well received and Doogood made plans for a follow up, Dinkum Oil, based on a novel by Frederick J Mills, but it was never shot.

It is considered a lost film.

References

External links

Algie's Romance at National Film and Sound Archive

1918 films
Australian drama films
Australian black-and-white films
Australian silent feature films
Lost Australian films
1918 drama films
Films shot in Adelaide
1918 lost films
Lost drama films
Silent drama films